Sailing as a form of transportation and for fishing has a very long history in India, owing to the large coastline and many rivers. Vessels from all parts of the world sailed to India down the ages for trade and many Indian sailors served on these ships. Sailing as a sport in India can be traced back to the first recorded race being sailed on 6 February 1830 in the western city of Bombay. Till the time the British left India in 1947, there were five active sailing clubs located at Bombay, Madras, Bangalore, Barrackpore and Nainital. Today, there are clubs located in Kerala, Pune, Goa, Hyderabad, and Bhopal. The Yachting Association of India is the governing body for sailing, windsurfing and motorboating in India. The Yachting Association of India was formally constituted on 15 May 1960. In 2011, Peter Conway of England was appointed as the national sailing coach.  India’s first National Sailing School (NSS) was opened at the Upper Lake in Bhopal in 2006, with support from the Indian Navy and the Yachting Association of India.

Indians in Olympic sailing
The following sailors have represented India in the Olympics:
  Munich, 1972, Soli Contractor and A. A. Basith, 29th in Flying Dutchman Class
  Los Angeles, 1984, Farokh Tarapore & Dhruv Bhandari, 17th in 470 Class
  Seoul, 1988, Farokh Tarapore & Kelly Rao, 17th in 470 Class
  Barcelona, 1992, Farokh Tarapore & Cyrus Cama, 23rd in 470 Class
  Athens, 2004, Malav Shroff & Sumeet Patel, 19th in 49er Class
  Beijing, 2008, Nachhatar Singh Johal, 23rd in Finn Class
  Tokyo 2020, 17th in Men's 49er, 20th in Men's Laser, 35th in Women's Laser Radial

Total medals won by Indian Sailors in Major tournaments

See also
 :Category:Indian sailors

References

External links
 Yachting Association of India
 Sailing Times India
 Topper Sailing India